John W. Hayden, Jr. (born December 4, 1965) is an American law enforcement officer who was appointed as the 35th Police Commissioner of St. Louis, Missouri on December 28, 2017, by former Mayor Lyda Krewson, and was St. Louis' fourth African-American Police Commissioner.

Early life and education
Hayden was born in St. Louis. He attended and graduated from Lutheran High School North (Missouri) in 1981. He received his Bachelor of Mathematics degree from Washington University in St. Louis and his master's degree in management from Fontbonne University. He was accepted into Saint Louis University School of Law and has completed over 50 credits in their Juris Doctor program. He has also completed 15 hours of graduate coursework in theological studies at the Covenant Theological Seminary.

Career
Hayden joined the St. Louis Metropolitan Police Department on February 23, 1987, where he served in the Fourth District. He also was assigned to the Vice/Narcotics Division, Fourth District Detective Unit and the Police Academy and Commander of North Patrol. He was appointed as Commissioner of Police on December 28, 2017, at a salary of $153,000 a year.

He retired as Commissioner of Police on June 18, 2022

As Commissioner of Police Hayden was responsible for planning, directing, managing and overseeing the activities and operations of the Metropolitan Police Department, including field operations, investigations, support services, and general administration. He coordinated activities with other city departments and outside agencies. He oversaw a department of 1,350 officers and 465 civilian employees with a yearly budget of $370 million.

Hayden is a life member of Kappa Alpha Psi. He is a member of the Police Executive Research Forum, the International Association of Chiefs of Police and the Major Cities Police Chiefs Association. He has served as a deacon at Pleasant Green Missionary Baptist Church in St. Louis since 1998.

References

1962 births
Living people
People from St. Louis
African-American police officers
Washington University in St. Louis alumni
Washington University in St. Louis mathematicians
Mathematicians from Missouri
Fontbonne University alumni
Commissioners of the St. Louis Metropolitan Police Department
Missouri Democrats
Saint Louis University School of Law alumni
Covenant Theological Seminary alumni